Ellen Bryant Voigt (born May 9, 1943) is an American poet. She served as the Poet Laureate of Vermont.

Biography
Voigt was born May 9, 1943, in Danville, Virginia. She grew up in Chatham, Virginia, graduated from Converse College, and received an M.F.A. from the University of Iowa. She has taught at M.I.T. and Goddard College where in 1976 she developed and directed the nation's first low-residency M.F.A. in Creative Writing program. Since 1981 she has taught in the Warren Wilson College MFA Program for Writers.

She has published six collections of poetry and a collection of craft essays. Her poetry collection Shadow of Heaven (2002) was a finalist for the National Book Award and Kyrie (1995) was a finalist for the National Book Critics Circle Award. Her collection Messenger (2008) was a finalist for the Pulitzer Prize. Her poetry has been published in several national publications. She served as the Poet Laureate of Vermont for four years and in 2003 was elected a Chancellor of the Academy of American Poets. In 2015, Voigt was awarded a MacArthur Fellowship.

She was married to Francis (Fran) Voigt, an administrator at Goddard College, until his death in 2018. Their two children are Dudley and Will Voigt. She resides in Cabot, Vermont.

Bibliography

 The Forces of Plenty, Carnegie Mellon University Press, 1983; Carnegie Mellon University Press, 1996, 
 The Lotus Flowers: Poems (New York: W.W. Norton & Company, 1987. )
 Two Trees W. W. Norton, Incorporated, 1992, 
 Kyrie, W.W. Norton, 1995, 
 Shadow of Heaven (New York: W.W. Norton & Company, 2002)
 
  (essays)

Poems 
"Owl", 2013.

Awards and honors
 MacArthur Fellowship, 2015
 National Endowment for the Arts grant recipient
 Guggenheim Foundation grant recipient
 67th Academy of American Poets Fellowship, 2001
 Vermont Council of Arts grant recipient
 Pushcart Prize
 Lila Wallace-Reader's Digest Fund fellowship
 Poet Laureate of Vermont, 1999–2002
 O. B. Hardison, Jr. Poetry Prize, 2002
 Elected Chancellor of The Academy of American Poets, 2003

References

External links
 MacArthur Fellow Ellen Bryant Voigt on the poetry of small-town life, PBS NewsHour, Mary Jo Brooks  October 21, 2015 
 MacArthur ‘Genius’ Ellen Bryant Voigt: ‘Poetry Is An Intelligence’, WBUR, October 12, 2015 
"Interview with Ellen Bryant Voigt by Monica Mankin. Fugue Literary Journal, University of Idaho. Winter 2003/2004.
 A Lecture by Ellen Bryant Voigt Blackbird  December 1, 2004.
 An Interview with Ellen Bryant Voigt Blackbird  March 30, 2005.
 About Ellen Bryant Voight: A Profile Ploughshares  Winter 1996–97.
 "The Author" in The Lotus Flower: Poems. New York: W.W. Norton & Company. 1987. .
 "Ellen Bryant Voigt". Poets.org. The Academy of American Poets. (retrieved 03/01/2007)

1943 births
Living people
20th-century American women writers
American women poets
Converse University alumni
Goddard College faculty
Iowa Writers' Workshop alumni
Massachusetts Institute of Technology faculty
National Endowment for the Arts Fellows
People from Chatham, Virginia
People from Cabot, Vermont
Place of birth missing (living people)
Poets from Vermont
Poets from Virginia
Poets Laureate of Vermont
The New Yorker people
Warren Wilson College faculty
MacArthur Fellows
American women academics
21st-century American women